Rosan Girard (born 16 October 1913 in Le Moule, Guadeloupe; died 5 June 2001) was a politician from Guadeloupe who served in the French National Assembly from 1946 to 1958.

References 
page on the French National Assembly website

1913 births
2001 deaths
People from Le Moule
Guadeloupean politicians
French Communist Party politicians
Deputies of the 1st National Assembly of the French Fourth Republic
Deputies of the 2nd National Assembly of the French Fourth Republic
Deputies of the 3rd National Assembly of the French Fourth Republic